Line B is a line on the Prague Metro. Chronologically the third to open, it was first opened in 1985 and continued to expand in the 1990s.

History

Rolling stock
81-71: 1985 - July 2009
81-71M: 2006 - present

External links
 
M. Peralta – Undergraduate research project. Includes a collection of statistical data for transect B (yellow line) on total entrances, and connecting bus & tram routes for each metro hub.
Architecture photo series of all stations of B line (Prague Metro)
 Website is available in Czech, English and German
 Metro map

Prague Metro
Railway lines opened in 1985